Palakkattu Madhavan (aka Palakkad Madhavan) is a 2015 Tamil language comedy drama film written and directed by M Chandramohan and produced by TCM. The film stars Vivek and Sonia Agarwal in the lead roles, while Sheela essays a supporting role.

Plot
Palakattu Madhavan (Vivek) is a lazy, irresponsible man. Embarrassed that his wife Lakshmi (Sonia Agarwal) earns more than he does, he quits his job out of spite.  He then adopts the old woman Pattu Maami (Sheela) as a surrogate mother because she offers to pay cash for the opportunity. The character "Palakkattu Madhavan" is also an acknowledgement of a character with the same name in the movie Andha 7 Naatkal starring Bhagyaraj and Ambika.

Cast

 Vivek as Palakattu Madhavan
 Sonia Agarwal as Lakshmi
 Sheela as Pattu Maami
 Rajendran as U. Santosh Kumar
 Aarthi as Kokilla Maami
 Swaminathan as Vichu Maama
 Cell Murugan as Chittukuruvi
 Crane Manohar as Suppudu
 Manobala as Madhavan's boss
 Imman Annachi as Samuthirapandian
 Karate Raja as Pattu Maami's real son
 Singamuthu as Lingusamy / "Link" Samy
 T. P. Gajendran as Kuberan Travels Owner
 Pandu as Minister's PA
 Abhinayashree (special appearance)

Production
The film began production in June 2014, with M Chandramohan opting to direct a film to be produced by TCM starring Vivek in the lead role.

Reception
Sify gave the film four out of five stars, noting the film engages the audience due to the presence of actor Vivek in the lead role. Times of India generally praised the film but declared its writing somewhat weak and wrote "[t]he entire first half is wasted with redundant scenes that try to tell us what a lazy person Madhavan is."  A flaw was noted in writer/director M Chandramohan not developing his characters and letting them remain caricatures. Also, a lack of consistency in their behaviors prevented viewers from caring about them as much as was wished, and it was disliked that the director repeatedly had actor Vivek break the fourth wall for the sake of comedy.

The film collected  in Chennai on first day turning out to be a disappointment. The film collected  in the Box Office.

Soundtrack
Music is composed by Srikanth Deva. Anirudh Ravichander has sung "Uchimela" for which Vivek wrote the lyrics.

References

External links
 
 

2015 films
2010s Tamil-language films
Indian comedy films
Films scored by Srikanth Deva
2015 comedy films